"In a New York Minute" is a song written by Tom Shapiro, Michael Garvin and Chris Waters, and recorded by American country music artist Ronnie McDowell.  It was released in January 1985 as the first single and title track from his album In a New York Minute.  The song reached #5 on the Billboard Hot Country Singles chart in May 1985 and #1 on the RPM Country Tracks chart in Canada.

Chart performance

References

1985 singles
1985 songs
Ronnie McDowell songs
Songs written by Tom Shapiro
Songs written by Chris Waters
Song recordings produced by Buddy Killen
Epic Records singles
Songs written by Michael Garvin